The 2015 Trofeo Laigueglia was the 52nd edition of the Trofeo Laigueglia road cycling race. For the first time, the race was ranked as a 1.HC race by the UCI. It was part of the 2015 UCI Europe Tour and was held on 19 February 2015.

The 2014 champion was José Serpa, but he was not selected to defend his title. Philippe Gilbert had intended to start the race, but a stomach illness caused his withdrawal. Favourites for victory in the race included Moreno Moser and Dan Martin (both ), Oscar Gatto, Damiano Cunego and Fabio Felline (Italy).

The race was hilly throughout, with two difficult climbs in the final , including the difficult climb of Colla Micheri.

The race was won by Davide Cimolai, from a 24-man sprint. This was the third year in a row that a Lampre cyclist had won the race, following Serpa in 2014 and Filippo Pozzato in 2013. It was Cimolai's first ever professional victory.

Teams 

20 teams were selected to take part, including five UCI WorldTeams.

 
 
 
 
 
 
 
 
 
 
 Italy (national team)

Race summary
The field stayed together for the first , but a breakaway formed on the first climb of the day. Jonathan Paredes, Nicola Gaffurini, Adriano Brogi and Jérôme Cousin built a lead that extended to approximately seven minutes. Cousin held out alone at the head of the race, but was caught on the climb.

On the run in to the finish, Ilnur Zakarin attacked alone on the climb of Colla Micheri, but failed to establish a gap. He tried again on the final climb, Capo Mele, and was joined by Simone Stortoni and Linus Gerdemann. , however, had several riders in the main group and were able to catch the breakaway and set up the sprint for Davide Cimolai. Aided in particular by Przemysław Niemiec, Cimolai won the race in a sprint ahead of Francesco Gavazzi and Alexey Tsatevich.

Result

References

External links

Trofeo Laigueglia
Trofeo Laigueglia
Trofeo Laigueglia